Su Hui (born May 1956) is a Chinese politician and leader of the Taiwan Democratic Self-Government League (Taimeng).

Biography 

Su was born to Cai Xiao, a native of Tainan, Taiwan and former Taimeng chairman.

From 1978 to 1982, Su majored in Finance in the Central University of Finance and Economics.

In 1982, she started working at the Beijing Municipal Finance Bureau, where she later held multiple leadership positions.

In December 2017, she was elected as chairperson of the Taiwan Democratic Self-Government League at its 10th national congress.

References

External links 
 Official profile at Taimeng (in Chinese)

1956 births
Chinese women in politics
Chinese Communist Party politicians from Jilin
Central University of Finance and Economics alumni
Politicians from Changchun
Members of the Taiwan Democratic Self-Government League
Leaders of political parties in China
Members of the Standing Committee of the 12th National People's Congress
Members of the 11th Chinese People's Political Consultative Conference
Vice Chairpersons of the National Committee of the Chinese People's Political Consultative Conference
Living people
Chinese people of Taiwanese descent